is a PlayStation 2 otome adventure game developed by Ruby Party and published by Koei. Harukanaru Toki no Naka de 3 is the third installment in the Harukanaru Toki no Naka de series.

The storyline takes place 100 years after the events in Harukanaru Toki no Naka de 2, and is a part of Ruby Party's Neo Romance label, the Second series.

Story 
One hundred years after the Harukanaru Toki no Naka de 2:

Nozomi Kasuga and her two friends encounter a strange boy at their high school, one rainy day, who sends them hurtling across time and space to a place in another world called Kyō. This place bears a strong resemblance to Kyoto at the end of the Heian period, where the Minamoto clan (Genji), led by Minamoto no Yoritomo (based on the historical Minamoto no Yoritomo), is at war with the Taira clan (Heike), led by Taira no Kiyomori (based on the historical Taira no Kiyomori). The Heike hope to defeat the Genji by releasing vengeful spirits (onryō) to disturb the Earth's natural flow of energies and to terrorize the land. The boy that Nozomi met is revealed to be the human form of Hakuryū, the White Dragon God said to protect Kyō, whose powers have greatly weakened due to the presence of the onryō.

Characters

Main characters 
  
 Voiced by: 
 The main character.  A girl in her second year of high school.  Chosen by the god called Hakuryū (White Dragon) to be his priestess, she is brought to a strange world where the Genji and the Heike wage war with one another.  In order to return home, she must fight alongside the Genji against the Heike.  Having obtained the power to cross time, she is determined to save those friends she loses in battle.  She grew up with the Arikawa brothers, and until recently the three of them have virtually always been together. In the anime, she harbours feelings for Masaomi.
  
 Voiced by: 
 .  Nozomi's childhood friend and classmate, and Yuzuru's older brother. A charismatically bold and reliable young man.  He is separated from Nozomi and Yuzuru when they are sent across time and space, and the only contact Nozomi has with him is through her dreams.  When they finally meet again, Nozomi discovers that Masaomi arrived in this new world three years before them. Unknown to Nozomi and most of the other (Genji-allied) Hachiyō, he is actually in league with the Heike clan and is better known as the fearsome general Kaeri naifu (還内府). Masaomi and Nozomi have mutual feelings for one another, though they do not show it. Masaomi cares about Nozomi, when he gives her a gift (a musical antique watch) because she likes it, when they were in the human world.
  
 Voiced by: 
 .  A general of the Genji army.  Called "Kurō" (rather than "Yoshitsune"). He initially opposes Nozomi's wish to fight, believing that women should not be exposed to the dangers of the battlefield, but readily accepts her when she can prove herself in battle. He is easily misjudged due to his blunt way of speaking, but in fact he takes very good care of his men and of other people. Kurō is an extremely hard worker, and because he deeply esteems his older brother, Minamoto no Yoritomo, he strives wholeheartedly to do everything he can for the Genji clan. In the anime, he loves Nozomi. He is based on the historical Minamoto no Yoshitsune.
  
 Voiced by: 
 .  Mysterious young man who appears without reason during Nozomi's stay in Kumano.  Seems to be a part of the Kumano navy.  Bright, fearless, and easygoing.  Though he is young, no matter what the situation he always has levelheadedness to spare.  Hinoe likes to flirt with girls, and upon learning that Nozomi is Miko, he seems to take an interest in her and goes out of his way to see her. His real name is Fujiwara no Tanzou, and he is the Kumano Bettou, in charge of the Kumano Navy.
  
 Voiced by: 
 .  Kurō's confidant and military tactician, well informed in many areas of knowledge.  A seemingly calm-mannered young man.  Originally a fighting monk from Mt. Hiei, he left the temple to be an herbalist.  He helps the confused protagonist upon her arrival in the strange world.  Benkei has sociable manners, but at his essence, cannot help but to tease girls like Nozomi.  He is based on the historical Musashibō Benkei.
  
 Voiced by: 
 .  Nozomi's childhood friend and one year her junior.  Younger brother of Masaomi, the Ten no Seiryū.  Though only a first-year in high school, he is very mature.  He is a perfectly behaved honors student who likes archery.  Yuzuru suffers from unrequited love for Nozomi and is unable to tell her his feelings.  He worries and fusses a lot, but he has a soft spot for her.
  
 Voiced by: 
 . Showy and frivolous, the army magistrate and a military commander of the Genji. Confidant of Kurō's older brother, Minamoto no Yoritomo. Although a soldier, Kagetoki also uses a gun-like tool to effect Onmyōji arts. He appears to be showing off, but he is careful and attentive to people's relationships. He is based on the historical Kajiwara Kagetoki.
  
 Voiced by: 
 .  A young nobleman of the enemy Heike clan.  Nozomi finds him collapsed from his wounds on the battlefield and takes him in.  A young man of few words, he refrains from associating much with other people.  Atsumori joins Nozomi for the sake of helping purify and absolve the suffering onryō, but having to fight against his own clan pains him greatly.  He is skilled at the flute.  He is based on the historical Taira no Atsumori.
  
 Voiced by: 
 .  Nozomi and Kurō's sword instructor.  Sometimes called a tengu of Mt. Kurama.  He gives off a silent, dark, cold impression, but he is in fact very gentle and kind.  Because he is a descendant of the Oni Clan -- the same clan that long ago plagued Heian Kyō with crises -- he possesses special powers, such as the ability to teleport.  He watches over Nozomi, and guides her in ways that are at times gentle and at others, harsh.  Nozomi and Kurō call him "Sensei", and Saku and the other Hachiyou affectionately call him "Rid-sensei".  Ridvan's character is loosely based on the tengu that folktales say taught Minamoto no Yoshitsune his swordsmanship.
  
 Voiced by: 
 Younger sister of Kagetoki and only a year older than Nozomi, yet very mature. She is romantically involved with Kokuryū until the day he mysteriously disappears. She is very fond of Nozomi, whom she calls her 'twin'. She is an excellent dancer and later imparts her knowledge in that area to Nozomi, giving her a fan to practice her performance.
  
 Voiced by:  (adult form),  (child form
 The Ryūjin who summoned Nozomi and the Arikawa brothers through time and space to a foreign world. Having lost all his powers, he first appeared in the form of a child when Nozomi met him. He deeply trusts Nozomi and is saddened by his powerlessness. Gradually as he gains more power, he takes the form of an adult (surprising Nozomi and the others) but he still retains his child-like innocence.

Genji Clan 
 
 Voiced by: 
 Leader of the Genji clan, older brother of Minamoto no Kurou Yoshitsune, the Chi no Seiryuu, and master of Kajiwara Kagetoki, the Chi no Byakko. He holds the title Kamakura-dono. He is a cool-headed and severe man who wields great political and military power.  He is based on the historical Minamoto no Yoritomo.
 
 Voiced by: 
 Wife of Minamoto no Yoritomo. She deeply adores Yoritomo and as his proxy does everything in her power to support him. While she appears gentle and kind, always speaking sweetly and respectfully, she actually hides a more sinister power. She is based on the historical Hojo Masako.

Heike Clan 
 
 Voiced by: 
 A commander of the Heike clan who exhibits little concern towards conventional moral guidelines. While educated and cultured, he loves the exhilaration of battle and is fiercely attracted to Nozomi's swordsmanship skills and determination. He is the son of Taira no Kiyomori. He is based on the historical Taira no Tomomori.
 
 Voiced by: 
 A commander of the Heike clan and the beloved older brother of Taira no Atsumori, the Ten no Genbu. Tsunemasa carries an air of nobility and believes in avoiding fighting when possible. He is gentle and refined and is a gifted biwa player. A man with a soft external appearance, he is also a close aide of Kaerinaifu. He is based on the historical Taira no Tsunemasa.
 
 Voiced by: 
 Also a Heike commander. He has a pretty face and carries himself elegantly, unlike the wild Tomomori. He believes that destruction and chaos are beautiful, and has no hesitation in using cruelty in his methods. He is based on the historical Taira no Koremori.
 
 Voiced by: 
 Leader of the Heike clan and father of Taira no Tomomori. He had died as an old man but was revived as an onryou in the form of a boy. He took in a lost and starving 17-year-old Masaomi because he resembled his late beloved son, Taira no Shigemori. He is based on the historical Taira no Kiyomori.

Others 
 
 Voiced by: 
 A character that first appeared in the Izayoiki fan disc. An elegant and refined young man with no memories of his past, Shirogane is the loyal retainer of Fujiwara no Yasuhira and serves Nozomi thoughtfully and faithfully according to his orders. A mysterious warrior with a striking physical resemblance to Taira no Tomomori.  He is eventually discovered to be Taira no Shigehira, Tomomori's younger brother and son of Taira no Kiyomori. He is based on the historical Taira no Shigehira.
 
 Voiced by: 
 Also, a character that first appeared in the Izayoiki fan disc. Shirogane's master, the eldest son of the leader of Hiraizumi, Fujiwara no Hidehira, and an old acquaintance of Kurou, who had lived in Hiraizumi under Hidehira's care as a youth.  Discerning, rational, and clever, Yasuhira treats Nozomi, the Hakuryū no Miko, with courtesy, but there are times when a cruel smile surfaces...  He manages Hiraizumi's military forces and has a deep knowledge of sorcery and onmyōji arts. He is based on the historical Fujiwara no Yasuhira.

Titles 
 Harukanaru Toki no Naka de 3. (Main Game). Released on December 22, 2004 for PlayStation 2.
 Harukanaru Toki no Naka de 3, Izayoi-ki. Released on September 22, 2005 for PS2.
 Harukanaru Toki no Naka de 3, Unmei no Meikyū (Labirinth). Released on March 23, 2006 for PS2.
 Harukanaru Toki no Naka de 3 with Izayoi-ki, Aizōban. Released on March 19, 2009 for PlayStation Portable.
 Harukanaru Toki no Naka de 3, Unmei no Meikyū, Aizōban. Released on March 23, 2006 for PSP.
 Harukanaru Toki no Naka de 3，Ultimate. Released on March 23, 2006 for PlayStation Vita. Full voiced version.

TV Anime 
 Kurenai no Tsuki (The Moon of Scarlet). Broadcast in Kids-station on 28 December 2007.
 Opening theme: Unmei no Tsuki wa Kurenai
 Ending theme : Gyakufū no Toki ni Hitori
 Owarinaki Unmei (The Endless Fate). Broadcast in AT-X on 3 January 2010. 
 Opening theme: Kirameki no Tsuki
 Ending theme : Yūkyū no Gekkō
 Inserted song: Dakuryū no Hotori, Seiryū no Fuchi

CDs 
 BGM collection:
 Harukanaru Toki no Naka de 3 - Original Soundtrack
 Drama CD:
 Harukanaru Toki no Naka de 3 - Usudukiyo 1 ~ Reimei no shō ~
 Harukanaru Toki no Naka de 3 - Usudukiyo 2 ~ Tasogare no shō ~
 Vocal variety CD:
 Harukanaru Toki no Naka de 3 - Ariake no Uta
 Harukanaru Toki no Naka de 3 - Izayoi-ki, Tsuki no Shizuku
 Harukanaru Toki no Naka de 3 - Hanaduki no Yoi
 Harukanaru Toki no Naka de 3 - Yukimachi-duki
 Harukanaru Toki no Naka de 3 - Oborodukiyo
 Harukanaru Toki no Naka de 3 Kurenai no Tsuki - Dai-1-ya
 Harukanaru Toki no Naka de 3 Kurenai no Tsuki - Dai-2-ya
 Harukanaru Toki no Naka de 3 Kurenai no Tsuki - Vocal Collection
 Harukanaru Toki no Naka de 3 with Izayoi-ki Aizō-ban ~ Shinonome duki
 Harukanaru Toki no Naka de 3 ~ Owarinaki Unmei ~ Vocal Collection, Eiketsu no Sakuraduki

Notes and References

External links 
 Koei's Haruka 3 official site
 My NeoRomance
 Koei's Neoromance site

2004 video games
2005 video games
2006 video games
Otome games
Japan-exclusive video games
PlayStation 2 games
PlayStation 2-only games
PlayStation Vita games
Video games developed in Japan
Visual novels
Yumeta Company